This is a list of members of the Victorian Legislative Assembly from 1976 to 1979, as elected at the 1976 state election:

 On 10 September 1977, the Liberal member for Greensborough, Monte Vale, died. Labor candidate Pauline Toner won the resulting by-election on 5 November 1977.
 Two Liberal MLAs, Charles Francis (Caulfield) and Doug Jennings (Westernport) were expelled from the Liberal Party in September 1977 after abstaining on an opposition no-confidence motion over Housing Commission of Victoria land deals. Both MLAs served out their terms as independents.
 In November 1977, the Labor member for Melbourne, Barry Jones, resigned to contest the federal seat of Lalor at the 1977 federal election. Labor candidate Keith Remington won the resulting by-election on 17 December 1977.
 In November 1977, the Labor member for Richmond, Clyde Holding, resigned to contest the federal seat of Melbourne Ports at the 1977 federal election. Labor candidate Theo Sidiropoulos won the resulting by-election on 17 December 1977.
 Gisborne Liberal MLA Athol Guy resigned due to ill health in March 1979. No by-election was held due to the imminent 1979 state election.

Members of the Parliament of Victoria by term
20th-century Australian politicians